Francisco Cáceres (born 8 October 1974) is a Salvadoran weightlifter. He competed in the men's featherweight event at the 1996 Summer Olympics.

References

1974 births
Living people
Salvadoran male weightlifters
Olympic weightlifters of El Salvador
Weightlifters at the 1996 Summer Olympics
Place of birth missing (living people)